Oru Vadakkan Veeragatha is a 1989 Indian Malayalam-language epic historical drama film directed by Hariharan, written by M. T. Vasudevan Nair, and starring Mammootty, Suresh Gopi, Balan K. Nair, Captain Raju and Madhavi. The film won four National Film Awards (1989) including Best Actor (Mammootty), Best Screenplay (M. T. Vasudevan Nair), Best Production Design and Best Costume Design (P. Krishnamoorthy) and eight Kerala State Film Awards.

This film is based on a subplot of Vadakkan Pattukal, a medieval ballad from North Malabar and is often regarded as a classic of Malayalam cinema. The story is a reinterpretation of the life of the legendary Chandu Chekavar and depicts him as an unlucky and misunderstood but ultimately honourable man rather than the traitorous character that earned him the sobriquet of Chathiyan Chandu (literally 'Chandu the Betrayer') in folklore.

Plot 
The film is set in 16th-century northern Kerala. The plot unfolds at Puthooram, the house of the great Kannappan Chekavar. The Chekavar clan provide martial services to their lords by training and providing fighters to help settle feudal disputes through trial by combat. Kannappan Chekavar adopts the son of his estranged sister when the boy loses both his parents and brings him to Puthooram to live and learn with his cousins. The orphan boy, Chandu, a quick learner, earns the love and admiration of his uncle, while he is loathed by his cousin Aromal.

As they grow up, Chandu is betrothed to Chekavar's daughter, Unniyarcha. Chandu is constantly mocked and made to feel like an outsider by the jealous Aromal. He even ends his sister's budding romance with Chandu by marrying her off to his unmanly but better-off friend Kunjiraman. The lack of protest on Unniyarcha's part breaks Chandu's heart. He attempts to move on by proposing to Kunjinooli, another girl who professed her love for him. Aromal preempts his proposal by breaking off his own bethrotal and proposing to Kunjinooli himself. Disappointed, Chandu leaves to study Kalaripayattu under the tutelage of Tulunadan expert and master Chekavar, Aringodar.

On Aromal's wedding day, Unniyarcha invites Chandu to her room. When Kunjiraman unexpectedly arrives and finds them alone together, Unniyarcha convinces her husband that Chandu broke into her room by pretending to be him. A dejected Chandu, now with the reputation of being a womaniser, finds solace in Kunji, Aringodar’s daughter.

Feudal lord Unnichandror arrives at the footsteps of Aringodar and asks him to represent his cause in an angam (duel unto death) against his brother Unnikonar. Unnikonar, in turn, asks Aromal to represent him. Chandu is caught in a dilemma when his uncle requests him to play the second hand to Aromal in the angam against his teacher Aringodar. Unniyarcha approaches Chandu and offers to live with him if he helps Aromal win. Chandu is tempted and decides to second Aromal. He takes on the task of revitalizing Aromal's swords by giving them for treatment to a blacksmith. However, Kunji, Aringodar’s daughter, bribes the blacksmith to make them brittle.

On the day of the duel, Aromal, though highly skilled, is no match for the master Aringodar. To add to the misery, Aromal's sword breaks in two. Chandu placates an attacking Aringodar, seeking time to replace the weapon and he obliges. Aromal takes advantage of the momentarily unguarded Aringodar and throws his broken sword at him, killing him.

As the victorious Aromal retires to his resting place, Chandu follows him to tend to his injuries. Aromal accuses Chandu of sabotage by treating the swords to make them brittle, and attacks him. In their scuffle, Aromal accidentally stabs himself by falling over a lamp. As people gather, the mortally wounded Aromal accuses Chandu of betraying him with his last breath.

The ill-fated Chandu escapes the mob and finds the blacksmith, who informs him about Kunji's bribe. Fighting his way through an entire contingent of guards, the furious Chandu storms into Aringodar's household seeking Kunji. To add to his list of regrets, he finds Kunji has committed suicide by hanging herself. Chandu returns to Puthooram and is greeted by a raging Unniyarcha, who vows that her unborn sons will avenge her brother’s death.

Years later, Aromal Unni and Kannapan Unni (sons of Unniyarcha and Aromal Chekavar, respectively) come to Arangodar's kalari seeking revenge. Chandu refuses to fight them. However, after being repeatedly challenged, Chandu easily beats them both, once again showing his mastery. Hoping that they will leave before bloodshed is inevitable, he attempts to retire his weapons. The two young warriors are in no mood to leave in defeat and insist on a duel to the death. Aromal Unni announces that he will either return with Chandu's head or die himself. Chandu realises the madness in the youngsters and appears to relent to their provocations, turning his back to them as if to pray in preparation for the duel. But knowing that no one will ever be able to win against him, and reminded that Aromal is Kannappan Chekavar's grandson, he commits one final act of valour: Chandu stabs himself with his sword. Reminiscing bitterly on what could have been, he addresses Aromal Unni as his unborn son and hopes that he will earn renown for being the one to defeat Chandu and avenge his uncle. He reaches out to the statue of his deity and dies. There ends the life of a valiant but misunderstood man, the greatest warrior of his age.

Cast 

Mammootty as Chandu Chekavar
Suresh Gopi as Aromal Chekavar
Balan K. Nair as Kannappan Chekavar
Captain Raju as Aringodar
Madhavi as Unniyarcha
Geetha as Kunji
Rajalakshmi as Kuttimani
Jomol as young Unniyarcha
Vineeth Kumar as young Chandu
Vishal Menon as young Kunjiraman
Biyon as Child Artist
Ramu as Unnichandror
Devan as Unnikonnar
Oduvil Unnikrishnan as the King
Chithra as Kunjinooli
Soorya as the blacksmith's daughter
Sanjay Mitra as Aromal Unni 
Rasheed Ummer as Kanappan Unni
Sukumari as Kannappan Chekavar's wife
V. K. Sreeraman as Kunjiraman
Sanoop Sajeendran as Master Thanku
Kundara Johny as Aringodar's student
Bheeman Raghu as Aringodar's student
Tony as Unnikannan

Soundtrack 
The film's soundtrack contains 5 songs, composed by Bombay Ravi. Lyrics by Kaithapram and K. Jayakumar.

Reception

Critical reception 
The film received commercial and critical acclaim upon its release. In a retrospect review Neelima Menon of The News Minute states that, "While Mammootty aces Chandu, delivering the verbose dialogues with finesse and precision, and bringing a sense of drama in his body language, Madhavi lives up to the picturization of Unniyarcha—with her luminous eyes, grace and a bearing that’s regal and confident, making it easier to forgive her character’s treachery. Captain Raju as the formidable Aringoder, Suresh Gopi as the cocky Aromal and Balan K Nair as the generous Kannappan Chekavar are all perfectly cast.

Box office 
The film was a commercial success. It was the highest grossing Malayalam film of the year. It ran for 375 days at Sangham theater (Calicut) in Kerala. Outside Kerala, it ran for more than 100 days in Madras and Coimbatore.

Awards
 National Film Awards
Best Screenplay – M. T. Vasudevan Nair
Best Actor – Mammootty (also for Mathilukal)
Best Art Direction – P. Krishnamoorthy
Best Costume Design – P. Krishnamoorthy

 Kerala State Film Awards
Best Popular Film
Best Screen Play – M. T. Vasudevan Nair
Best Actor – Mammootty
Second Best Actress – Geetha
Best Cinematography – K. Ramachandra Babu
Best Female Play Back Singer – K. S. Chithra
Best Child Artist - Vineeth Kumar
Best Art Director - P. Krishnamoorthy

 Kerala Film Critics Association Awards
 Second Best Film
 Best Actor – Mammootty
 Second Best Actor – Suresh Gopi
 Best Art Director – P. Krishnamoorthy
 Best Lyricist – K. Jayakumar
 Special Jury Award for Direction – Hariharan

 Filmfare Awards South
Filmfare Award for Best Film – Malayalam – P. V. Gangadharan

Legacy
Oru Vadakkan Veeragatha is regarded to be one of the greatest Malayalam films ever made and is considered a landmark film in Malayalam film history. Following its release, Oru Vadakkan Veeragatha has attained cult status in Malayalam cinema and receives re-runs on television channels. The film is only the third Malayalam film after Swayamvaram and Mukhamukham to receive four National Awards.

The character Mammootty portrays, Chandu is one of the most iconic characters in Malayalam cinema. The phrase "Chathiyan Chandu" is now very popular among Malayalis, It is used to refer to a person who betrays or cheats others. Chandu's final speech is also iconic among Malayali moviegoers. He is now subject to many Internet memes. The title of the film Chathikkatha Chanthu was inspired from this phrase.

The Times of India included the film in its list of "10 Malayalam films to watch before you die"  Sify.com included it in its list of "Ten Outstanding Performances From Mammootty."

References

External links

 movieraga.indulekha.com – വീണ്ടും ഒരു വടക്കന്‍വീരഗാഥ

Indian martial arts films
1980s Malayalam-language films
Films scored by Ravi
Kalarippayattu films
Films with screenplays by M. T. Vasudevan Nair
Films directed by Hariharan
Indian epic films
Films shot in Thrissur
Films featuring a Best Actor National Award-winning performance
Films whose production designer won the Best Production Design National Film Award
Films that won the Best Costume Design National Film Award
Films whose writer won the Best Original Screenplay National Film Award
1989 martial arts films
1989 films